In the programming language C++, unordered associative containers are a group of class templates in the C++ Standard Library that implement hash table variants. Being templates, they can be used to store arbitrary elements, such as integers or custom classes. The following containers are defined in the current revision of the C++ standard: unordered_set, unordered_map, unordered_multiset, unordered_multimap. Each of these containers differ only on constraints placed on their elements.

The unordered associative containers are similar to the associative containers in the C++ Standard Library but have different constraints. As their name implies, the elements in the unordered associative containers are not ordered. This is due to the use of hashing to store objects. The containers can still be iterated through like a regular associative container.

History

The first widely used implementation of hash tables in the C++ language was hash_map, hash_set, hash_multimap, hash_multiset class templates of the Silicon Graphics (SGI) Standard Template Library (STL). Due to their usefulness, they were later included in several other implementations of the C++ Standard Library (e.g., the GNU Compiler Collection's (GCC) libstdc++ and the Visual C++ (MSVC) standard library).

The hash_* class templates were proposed into C++ Technical Report 1 (C++ TR1) and were accepted under names unordered_*. Later, they were incorporated into the C++11 revision of the C++ standard. An implementation is also available in the Boost C++ Libraries as <boost/unordered_map.hpp>.

Overview of functions

The containers are defined in headers named after the names of the containers, e.g., unordered_set is defined in header <unordered_set>. All containers satisfy the requirements of the Container concept, which means they have begin(), end(), size(), max_size(), empty(), and swap() methods.

Usage example
#include <iostream>
#include <string>
#include <unordered_map>
 
int main()
{
    std::unordered_map<std::string, int> months;
    months["january"] = 31;
    months["february"] = 28;
    months["march"] = 31;
    months["april"] = 30;
    months["may"] = 31;
    months["june"] = 30;
    months["july"] = 31;
    months["august"] = 31;
    months["september"] = 30;
    months["october"] = 31;
    months["november"] = 30;
    months["december"] = 31;
    std::cout << "september -> " << months["september"] << std::endl;
    std::cout << "april     -> " << months["april"] << std::endl;
    std::cout << "december  -> " << months["december"] << std::endl;
    std::cout << "february  -> " << months["february"] << std::endl;
    return 0;
}

Custom hash functions
To use custom objects in std::unordered_map, a custom hash function must be defined. This function takes a const reference to the custom type and returns a size_t
#include <unordered_map>
 
struct X{int i,j,k;};

struct hash_X{
  size_t operator()(const X &x) const{
    return std::hash<int>()(x.i) ^ std::hash<int>()(x.j) ^ std::hash<int>()(x.k);
  }
};

The user defined function can be used as is in std::unordered_map, by passing it as a template parameter 
 std::unordered_map<X,int,hash_X> my_map;

Or can be set as the default hash function by specializing the std::hash function
namespace std {
    template <>
        class hash<X>{
        public :
        size_t operator()(const X &x ) const{
            return hash<int>()(x.i) ^ hash<int>()(x.j) ^ hash<int>()(x.k);
        }
    };
}

//...
 std::unordered_map<X,int> my_map;

References

Articles with example C++ code
C++ Standard Library